The Central Railroad of South Carolina was a South Carolina railroad that operated following Reconstruction. The line is in service today as CSX's Lane Subdivision.

History
The Central of South Carolina was chartered by the South Carolina General Assembly in 1876 under the Williamsburg Railroad moniker, but the name was changed shortly thereafter to Central Railroad of South Carolina. The line opened in 1882.

Ownership and leases
The line was leased to the Wilmington, Columbia and Augusta Railroad and the Northeastern Railroad, to which it connected on each end. The two lessees agreed to pay all taxes, keep the line in good repair and pay a rental rate of $30,000 annually.

The Central of South Carolina was owned by the Atlantic Coast Line Railroad beginning around 1900.  It was listed on Atlantic Coast Line employee timetables as their Sumter–Lanes Line (L Line).

In 1967, the Atlantic Coast Line Railroad and Seaboard Air Line Railroad merged to form the Seaboard Coast Line Railroad.  In 1980, the Seaboard Coast Line's parent company merged with the Chessie System, creating the CSX Corporation. The CSX Corporation operated the Chessie and Seaboard Systems separately until 1986, when they were merged into CSX Transportation.

Current operations

The Central Railroad of South Carolina is still in service and is now CSX's Lane Subdivision. At its west end it connects to CSX's A Line (Charleston Subdivision), and at its east it connects to the Orangeburg Subdivision and the Eastover Subdivision.

Historic stations

See also
 Alcolu Railroad

References

Defunct South Carolina railroads
Railway companies established in 1881
Railway companies disestablished in 1900
1881 establishments in South Carolina
American companies disestablished in 1900